S. malayanus may refer to:
 Sphecius malayanus, a wasp species in the genus Sphecius
 Suncus malayanus, a shrew species
 Synagrops malayanus, a fish species in the genus Synagrops

See also
 Malayanus